WOW Presents Plus (also called World of Wonder Presents Plus or WOWPresents+) is a subscription-based streaming service owned by production company, World of Wonder. The subscription service is founded in November 2017, by Randy Barbato and Fenton Bailey. The service offers a multitude of original series, including shows like Painted with Raven and UNHhhh. 

This service also exclusively includes RuPaul's Drag Race (though it is not available in the US) and its incarnations of the franchise. Many web series from WOW Presents' YouTube channel are included to their subscription service. The service is available worldwide, except for Mainland China, Syria, North Korea, and Russia. Business Insider names WOW Presents Plus, "best streaming service for 'Drag Race' fans".

Distribution 
The cost of the subscription service is $4.99 USD a month, for the yearly cost is $49.99 USD. It also offers users to download episodes for offline viewing.

Device support 
The streaming platform supports access through most modern web-browsers, such as iOS/iPadOS, Android and Android TV devices, Apple TV, Amazon Fire TV, and Roku.

Original programming 
WOW Presents Plus began to produce its own original content. Starting Trixie Mattel and Katya Zamolodchikova, hosting UNHhhh (an unscripted webseries), that premiered on YouTube then later included to the streaming service for its uncensored content. The first production series released is God Shave the Queens, which is their first original docuseries showcasing the RuPaul's Drag Race UK tour in the United Kingdom. World of Wonder announced new show lineups from early 2022. Many drag queens such as Jinkx Monsoon, Pangina Heals, Heidi N' Closet, and Rock M. Sakura; will star in their shows.

Animation

Comedy

Documentary

Reality

Unscripted

Films

Documentary

Exclusive programming 

The subscription service exclusively offers the American reality series, RuPaul's Drag Race, though it is not available in the United States (including RuPaul's Drag Race All Stars). The subscription service also includes its many incarnations of the franchise.

Reality

Upcoming original programming

References 

World of Wonder (company)
Internet television streaming services
Subscription video streaming services
Subscription video on demand services
Android (operating system) software
IOS software
2017 in film
2017 in television
American companies established in 2017